The Izvor is a right tributary of the river Crișul Repede in Romania. It flows into the Crișul Repede near Aleșd.

References

 Plan Urbanistic General-ORASUL ALESD - Primaria Alesd 

Rivers of Romania
Rivers of Bihor County